Lonicera cerviculata is a shrub in the genus Lonicera, family Caprifoliaceae, native to the Sierra Madre Occidental near the boundary between the Mexican states of Chihuahua and Sonora. It is a shrub up to 1.5 m tall with juicy, globose orange berries.

References

cerviculata
Flora of Mexico
Flora of Chihuahua (state)
Flora of Sonora